geWorkbench (genomics Workbench) is an open-source software platform for integrated genomic data analysis.  It is a desktop application written in the programming language Java. geWorkbench uses a component architecture. , there are more than 70 plug-ins available, providing for the visualization and analysis of gene expression, sequence, and structure data.
 
geWorkbench is the Bioinformatics platform of MAGNet, the National Center for the Multi-scale Analysis of Genomic and Cellular Networks, one of the 8 National Centers for Biomedical Computing funded through the NIH Roadmap (NIH Common Fund). Many systems and structure biology tools developed by MAGNet investigators are available as geWorkbench plugins.

Features
 Computational analysis tools such as t-test, hierarchical clustering, self-organizing maps, regulatory network reconstruction, BLAST searches, pattern-motif discovery, protein structure prediction, structure-based protein annotation, etc.  
 Visualization of gene expression (heatmaps, volcano plot), molecular interaction networks (through Cytoscape), protein sequence and protein structure data (e.g., MarkUs). 
 Integration of gene and pathway annotation information from curated sources as well as through Gene Ontology enrichment analysis. 
 Component integration through platform management of inputs and outputs.  Among data that can be shared between components are expression datasets, interaction networks, sample and marker (gene) sets and sequences.
 Dataset history tracking - complete record of data sets used and input settings.
 Integration with 3rd party tools such as Genepattern, Cytoscape, and Genomespace.

Demonstrations of each feature described can be found at http://wiki.c2b2.columbia.edu/workbench/index.php/Tutorials.

Versions
 geWorkbench is open-source software that can be downloaded and installed locally.  A zip file of the released version Java source is also available.
 Prepackaged installer versions also exist for Windows, Macintosh, and Linux.

See also
 Genome Compiler

References

External links
 , includes installation, tutorials, FAQs, known issues
 - geworkbench release downloads
 - geWorkbench plugins

Bioinformatics software
Free software
Cluster analysis
Systems biology
Protein structure
Gene expression